Pierre Henri (born 25 February 1983) is a French swimmer, who specialized in individual medley events. He represented his nation France at the 2008 Summer Olympics, and also claimed a silver medal in the 400 m individual medley at the 2001 European Junior Championships in Valletta, Malta (4:21.39). Henri is a member of Club Natation Canet 66 in Canet-en-Roussillon, and is coached and trained by Philippe Lucas.

Henri competed as a lone French swimmer in the men's 400 m individual medley at the 2008 Summer Olympics in Beijing. He topped the field with a time of 4:18.23 for an outright spot on the Olympic swimming team at the French Championships in Dunkirk, bettering the FINA A-standard (4:18.40) by just 0.17 of a second. Swimming in heat five, Henri came from the bottom of the field to power past the Greek swimmer Romanos Alyfantis by exactly a single second for the seventh spot in  4:22.41. Henri failed to advance to the top eight final, as he placed twenty-second overall in the prelims.

References

External links
 
 
 NBC Olympics Profile
 

1983 births
Living people
French male medley swimmers
Olympic swimmers of France
Swimmers at the 2008 Summer Olympics
Sportspeople from Quimper
21st-century French people